List of coats of arms of the 24 districts and the 12 urban districts in Rhineland-Palatinate, Germany

Districts

Urban districts

Rhineland-Palatinate, districts
Rhineland-Palatinate-related lists
Rhineland-Palatinate